

Delamere is a locality in the Northern Territory of Australia about  south of the territory capital of Darwin.

The locality consists of the following land (from north to south):
 The Aroona and Scott Creek pastoral leases, 
 The Willeroo, Mathison Station, Stapleton Station and Dixie Station pastoral leases, and 
 The Delamere pastoral lease, the Delamere Air Weapons Range and land identified as NT Portion 2119.  

The locality's boundaries and name were gazetted on 4 April 2007.  Its name is derived from the Delamere Station and ultimately from the name of the South Australian home of Dr WJ Browne, a former leaseholder.

The Victoria Highway passes through the locality from the Stuart Highway in the east to the Western Australian border in the west.  The Buntine Highway passes through the locality from the south and terminates at the Victoria Highway near the Willeroo homestead.

The Delamere Air Weapons Range occupies land in the locality's south-east corner on the east side of the Buntine Highway.  The following aboriginal communities are located within Delamere – Djarrung which is located on Scott Creek Station in the locality's north and Dillinya which is located in NT Portion 2119 in the locality's south-east.

The 2016 Australian census which was conducted in August 2016 reports that Delamere had a population of 37 people.

Delamere is located within the federal division of Lingiari, the territory electoral division of Stuart and the local government area of the Victoria Daly Region.

References

Populated places in the Northern Territory
Victoria Daly Region